Strickland-Roberts Homestead, also known as Bryncoed Farm, is a historic home located in West Vincent Township, Chester County, Pennsylvania. The original section dates to about 1800, and is a two-story, five-bay by one-bay, fieldstone structure. It has a gable roof, small shed-roofed porch, and terrace.  A -story, four-bay, random fieldstone addition was designed by R. Brognard Okie and built in 1929.  Also on the property is a contributing bank barn dated to 1873.  The house was purchased by U.S. Supreme Court Justice Owen J. Roberts in 1927, and is where he died in 1955.

It was added to the National Register of Historic Places in 1978.

References

Houses on the National Register of Historic Places in Pennsylvania
Houses completed in 1800
Houses in Chester County, Pennsylvania
National Register of Historic Places in Chester County, Pennsylvania